The Jatiya Samajtantrik Dal ('National Socialist Party') is a political party in Bangladesh. It was formed in 2002,  through a split from the original Jatiya Samajtantrik Dal. The party is sometimes referred to as JSD (Rab) (after prominent party leader ASM Abdur Rab), to differentiate it from the mother party led by Hasanul Haq Inu. The Election Commission of Bangladesh calls the party Jatiya Samajtantrik Dal-JSD and the Inu-led party Jatiya Samajtantrik Dal-Jasad.

References

 
2002 establishments in Bangladesh
Political parties established in 2002
Political parties in Bangladesh
Socialist parties in Bangladesh